Zacorisca aglaocarpa is a species of moth of the family Tortricidae. It is found on Seram Island in Indonesia and in India.

The moth's wingspan is about 37 mm. Its forewings are yellow, the terminal fifth suffused deep orange. There is a deep blue line running round the base of the dorsum and wing, continued on the costa to a moderate deep blue purple rather oblique postmedian fascia. There is a deep blue-purple marginal streak running round the costa from just beyond this. The hindwings are deep coppery orange, but yellow near the costa and with a large dark fuscous basal patch.

References

	

Moths described in 1924
Zacorisca